Havercroft is a small village situated on the B6428 in West Yorkshire, England, approximately  south-east of the city of Wakefield. It forms part of the civil parish of Havercroft with Cold Hiendley, which has a population of 2,103, increasing to 2,256 at the 2011 Census.

In the last 100 years it has grown from a small collection of homes to a thriving village in its own right. For hundreds of years, Havercroft was an agricultural community and the few people who lived here worked in the fields; it does not appear in the Doomsday Book but it can be traced back on old maps and charters of 1155, when Henry the Second, father of Richard the Lionheart, was King of England. Havercroft now maintains its own school, Havercroft J & I School. The Ryhill & Havercroft Sports Centre is shared with Ryhill as is the local health centre, Rycroft Primary Care Centre. Havercroft also has a 'community hub' known as the Havercroft & Ryhill Community Learning Centre (located in Ryhill) which is also the Havercroft Parish Hall. As well as the Living Hope Community Church established in 1960 at bottom of Cow Lane, which runs a number of community projects. The Havercroft with Cold Hiendley Parish Council meets there and the Centre provides a regular calendar of educational courses & community activities for both Havercroft and its neighbour Ryhill.

Havercroft suffered from high unemployment in the 1980s due to local pit closures.  Since then the village has become popular with commuters travelling to nearby towns such as Pontefract, Barnsley and Wakefield.

Havercroft is split into two undistinct sections, Newstead - occupying the higher ground of Newstead hill - and the main village of Havercroft. In terms of the built environment Havercroft is co-terminous with its Ryhill neighbour with the boundary of the two civil parishes following along streetside and garden fence rather than across open fields for much of its length.

The parish has a parish council, the lowest tier of local government.

References

External links

Ryhill website at AboutBritain.com
Ryhill and Havercroft Villages fan website

Villages in West Yorkshire
Geography of the City of Wakefield